Trachylepis punctatissima, commonly called the montane speckled skink or speckled rock skink, is a lizard in the skink family (Scincidae) which is widespread in southern Africa. The common and adaptable species occurs in a variety of habitat types at middle to high altitudes. It was for a time treated as a southern race of the African striped skink, T. striata.

Description
This skink is dark grey brown in colour with two golden brown stripes that run lengthwise on either side of the spine. The underside is dirty white or pale grey. Both sexes grow to a length of about 19 cm.

Habits and biology
They are diurnal and like to bask in the sun. Those in colder regions will spend a period in hibernation. They are ovoviviparous.

Range and races
It is native to eastern Zambia, southern Malawi and Botswana, eastern Zimbabwe, central and northern South Africa, Lesotho and western Eswatini. The population on Mount Mulanje in southern Malawi was formerly included with Mabuya striata subsp. punctatissima, but is now treated as a full species, Trachylepis mlanjensis, while the Eastern Highlands population in Zimbabwe may similarly prove to be distinct.

References

External references
 

punctatissima
Skinks of Africa
Reptiles of Botswana
Reptiles of Eswatini
Reptiles of Lesotho
Reptiles of Malawi
Reptiles of Zimbabwe
Reptiles of Zambia
Reptiles of South Africa
Taxa named by Andrew Smith (zoologist)
Reptiles described in 1849